Diego, Prince of Asturias and Portugal (Diego Felix; 15 August 1575 – 21 November 1582) was the fourth son of Philip II of Spain and his third son by his fourth wife, Anna of Austria.

Early life
At the time of his birth, Diego's elder brother, Prince Ferdinand, was still the heir-apparent. On the death Ferdinand in 1578, Diego became heir-apparent to the throne. Diego also had another elder brother, Carlos Lorenzo, who died in infancy. His mother had just learned of the death of Carlos Lorenzo, and she was said to have suffered such a shock from word of his death that it caused her to go into premature labour, giving birth to Diego.

He was formally invested as Prince of Asturias on 1 March 1580 by the Courts in Madrid. The poet Cristóbal de Virués dedicated a sonnet to the new Prince, where he proposed that Diego follow the steps of his father.

In 1580, his father became King of Portugal as well, making Diego heir-apparent of that realm also. His mother, Anna, died during a trip to their new kingdom. Diego and his siblings remained in Madrid under the care of half-sisters, Isabella Clara Eugenia and Catherine Michelle. The letters of Philip II make clear that he was extremely proud of Diego: he wrote that his son had already learned the alphabet and dancing by the age of five. In a letter dated 1582 the king wrote to the Indian Viceroy Francisco de Mascarenhas commanding that he bring an elephant to the Prince of Asturias as a gift. Philip II taught his son the Portuguese language so that one day Diego could speak as king with his Portuguese subjects. In addition, Philip II planned to betroth Diego to one of the daughters of John, Duke of Braganza and Catherine of Portugal.

Death 
Diego never became king. In late 1582 he contracted smallpox and died at the age of 7. At his death, Philip II was inconsolable, for the only heir-apparent to the throne remaining was the small and sickly Infante Philip, assuming the position of Prince of Asturias. The king gave orders that continuous prayers be said at the Church of Our Blessed Lady in Zaragoza for the health of the royal children remaining.

Diego's younger brother became King Philip III upon his father's death in 1598. Thus continued the lineage of the Spanish Habsburgs.

Ancestry

1575 births
1582 deaths
16th-century House of Habsburg
Princes of Asturias
Dukes of Montblanc
Princes of Portugal
Spanish infantes
Portuguese infantes
Heirs apparent who never acceded
Children of Philip II of Spain
Burials in the Pantheon of Infantes at El Escorial
Royalty and nobility who died as children
Sons of kings